Kim Yong-rim (born March 3, 1940) is a South Korean actress. Kim made her acting debut in 1961 and has since worked steadily in Korean dramas, notably Silver Grass, for which she won the Grand Prize (Daesang) at the MBC Drama Awards in 1985.

Filmography

Television series

Film

Variety show

Awards and nominations

References

External links 
 
 
 
 

1940 births
Living people
South Korean television actresses
South Korean film actresses
South Korean stage actresses
20th-century South Korean actresses
21st-century South Korean actresses
Korea University alumni
People from Seoul
Gwangsan Kim clan
Best Actress Paeksang Arts Award (television) winners